Ziplocal is a company that provides local search information across the United States through traditional print yellow pages. Ziplocal also provides digital services to small to medium-sized business, such as websites, local SEO (Search Engine Optimization), organic SEO, videos, reputation management and print yellow pages.

History 
In January 2010, Utah-based Phone Directories Company (PDC) entered into an agreement with Canpages and rebranded itself as Ziplocal. In March 2010, then-CEO Olivier Vincent organized the sale of Canpages (including Ziplocal's assets) to Yellow Pages Group (YPG). YPG then traded its US division (YPG Directories, LLC.) to Ziplocal, LP  in exchange for an "equity-to-equity swap". YPG now owns 35% of Ziplocal. Vincent then left his position as CEO of Canpages and became CEO and President of the Board of Directors of Ziplocal.

Vincent was the CEO of Ziplocal until 2011 when Mike Anderson, former SVP at Canpages, became CEO until 2012.

References

External links
Official Website

Internet search engines